Bhalobasha Aaj Kal  is a Dhallywood romantic comedy film directed by P A Kajol and produced by Jaaz Multimedia. The film features Shakib Khan and Mahiya Mahi in lead roles. It is the first collaboration between Khan and Jaaz Multimedia and the first between Khan and Mahiya Mahi. Filming began on 2 February 2013, and was wrapped up by June 2013. The film was released on Eid-ul-Fitr on 9 August 2013. Upon release, the film received positive reviews and declared as a superhit at box office. Also, was highest-grossing film of Jaaz Multimedia production till Shikari released.

Cast
 Shakib Khan as Rana
 Mahiya Mahi as Dana
 Ali Raj as Haidar
 Kabila as Mama
 Misha Sawdagor as Police officer
 Jamil
 Rehana Jolly
 Shiba Shanu
 Kala Aziz

Music

The soundtrack of Bhalobasha Aaj Kal composed by Shafik Tuhin, Fuad, Imon Shah, Sayeem Hasan And Ahmed Imtiaz Bulbul. with lyrics penned by Kabir Bokul, Ahmed Imtiaj Bulbul, Shafik Tuhin and Abdul Aziz.

Marketing
The first look of Bhalobasa Aaj Kal was revealed on 10 July 2013. A forty-two seconds promo teaser was released on 17 July 2013.

References

External links
 
 Bhalobasa Aaj Kal at Bangladesh Movie Database

2013 films
2013 romantic comedy films
Bengali-language Bangladeshi films
Bangladeshi romantic comedy films
Films scored by Emon Saha
Films scored by Ahmed Imtiaz Bulbul
Films scored by Fuad
Films scored by Shafiq Tuhin
2010s Bengali-language films
Jaaz Multimedia films